John Thurburn was a British banker. He was manager of the Mercantile Bank of India and member of the Legislative Council of Hong Kong.

Thurburn was the manager of the Chartered Mercantile Bank of India, London & China. He was appointed to the Shipping Charges Commission in 1897, the Subsidiary Coinage Committee in 1899, Committee on Registration of Chinese Partners in 1901, and the Committee on Education and Commission of Inquire into Public Works Department in 1902.

In 1900, he was appointed to the Legislative Council of Hong Kong as a representative of the Hong Kong General Chamber of Commerce vice Herbert Smith resigned. He later replaced R. M. Gray's seat in the Legislative Council in 1901 when Gray resigned.

Thurburn was also founding member of the Hong Kong Jockey Club in 1884 and Hong Kong Golf Club in 1889.

References

British bankers
British expatriates in Hong Kong
Hong Kong bankers
Members of the Legislative Council of Hong Kong

19th-century births
20th-century deaths
Year of birth missing
Year of death missing